Robert Keene (August 26, 1919 – March 20, 2010) was an American football player. 

A native of Detroit, Keene attended McKenzie High School and played college football at the University of Detroit. 

He played professional football in the National Football League (NFL) for the Detroit Lions during the 1943, 1944, and 1945 seasons. He appeared in 16 NFL games, three as a starter, and totaled 29 rushing yards and 118 receiving yards.

References

1919 births
2010 deaths
Mackenzie High School (Michigan) alumni
Detroit Titans football players
Detroit Lions players
Players of American football from Detroit